"Disco Inferno" is a song by The Trammps.

Disco Inferno may also refer to:

Disco Inferno (album), a 1976 disco album recorded by The Trammps which includes the song
Disco Inferno (band), a band formed in the late 1980s
Disco Inferno (musical), a 2006 musical set in the 1970s
Disco Inferno (wrestler) (born 1967), American professional wrestler born Glenn Gilbertti
"Disco Inferno" (50 Cent song), a 2004 song by 50 Cent
"Disco Inferno", a second-season episode of the show Quantum Leap
”Disco Inferno”, a first-season episode of the show ''Cold Case
”Disco Inferno”, a saying meaning "I learn through suffering" in Latin.